Anastasiya Yakimova was the defending champion, but decided not to participate this year.

Aleksandra Wozniak won the title, defeating Alizé Cornet in the final, 6–4, 7–5.

Seeds

Draw

Finals

Top half

Bottom half

References
 Qualifying and Main Draws

The Bahamas Women's Open - Singles